Soltész is a  Hungarian-language surname originated form the German word Schultheiß. Notable people with this surname include:
Árpád Soltész 
István Soltész
Julius Joseph Soltesz, birth name of Moose Solters
Miklós Soltész
Stefan Soltesz (1949–2022), Austrian conductor

See also

Hungarian-language surnames
Surnames of German origin
Occupational surnames